Ribbesbüttel is a municipality in the district of Gifhorn, in Lower Saxony, Germany. The Municipality Ribbesbüttel includes the villages of Ausbüttel, Druffelbeck, Ribbesbüttel, Vollbüttel and Warmbüttel.

References

Gifhorn (district)